The Kerala Film Critics Association Award for Best Female Playback Singer is one of the annual awards given at the Kerala Film Critics Association Awards, honouring the best in Malayalam cinema.

Superlatives

Winners

See also
 Kerala Film Critics Association Award for Best Male Playback Singer
 Kerala Film Critics Association Award for Best Music Director

References

Female Playback Singer
Film music awards
Indian music awards